ID-1 or ID1 may refer to:RECN7701159Q8

 ID-1 format, the standard "credit card" size for identification cards defined by ISO/IEC 7810
 A gene (inhibitor of DNA binding-1) which controls cancer metastasis
 Idaho's 1st congressional district